Katrin Uhlig (born 5 July 1982) is a German politician of the Alliance 90/The Greens who has been serving as a member of the Bundestag after the 2021 German federal election, representing the electoral constituency of Bonn.

Early career 
Upon graduating, Uhlig briefly worked at the European Climate Foundation in The Hague. She was a legislative advisor to the Green Party's parliamentary group in the State Parliament of North Rhine-Westphalia from 2010 to 2017. She moved to the German Association of Energy and Water Industries (BDEW) in 2017. From 2019 to 2021, Uhlig worked as legislative advisor to Oliver Krischer.

Political career 
In parliament, Uhlig has been serving on the Committee on Climate Action and Energy.

Other activities

Regulatory agencies 
 Federal Network Agency for Electricity, Gas, Telecommunications, Post and Railway (BNetzA), Alternate Member of the Advisory Board (since 2022)

Non-profit organizations 
 Haus der Geschichte, Member of the Board of Trustees (since 2022)
 German Federation for the Environment and Nature Conservation (BUND), Member
 German United Services Trade Union (ver.di), Member

References 

Living people
1982 births
People from Duisburg
21st-century German politicians
21st-century German women politicians
Members of the Bundestag for Alliance 90/The Greens
Members of the Bundestag 2021–2025
Female members of the Bundestag